Green Island is a small (145 m long x 50 m) artificial island in the Red Sea at the southern mouth of the Suez Canal.

History
Green Island was a fortress built by the British Army (probably by British Troops in Egypt or Rear-Admiral, Alexandria, Royal Navy) to protect the Suez Canal from air and sea attack during World War II. This waterway was of enormous strategic significance for Britain at this time. Located three kilometers south of Port Ibrahim and four kilometers south of the city of Suez and the mouth of the Suez Canal, the fortress was built on a bed of stable corals and made out of reinforced concrete. It consisted of a one-storey building with a large courtyard. At one end of the island, a concrete bridge jutted out into the water toward a circular five-metre-high tower supporting a radar site and two heavy anti-aircraft machine guns. A wall reinforced with thick rows of barbed wire was built at the water's edge, to deter attack from the sea.  Heavy machine guns were emplaced in the roof, and there were over a dozen machine gun nests. A series of concrete bunkers sat atop an  seawall, ringed by razor wire three rolls deep. There were several gun emplacements .

In 1969, during the War of Attrition between Israel and Egypt, the island was heavily defended. Its garrison consisted of approximately 70 Egyptian infantrymen and 12 special forces commandos, 14 machine gun positions (14.5 mm to 25 mm), two 37 mm anti-aircraft guns, and four 85 mm anti-aircraft guns. On the night of July 19, 1969 the island was raided by Israeli commandos (Operation Bulmus 6). The Egyptian facilities on the island were completely destroyed with Israeli casualties of three Sayeret Matkal and three Shayetet 13 commandos killed, and 11 wounded—a casualty rate of approximately 50%.

See also
1967 Six Day War
1973 Yom Kippur War

References

 Israeli Elite Units Since 1948 by Samuel Katz, Osprey Publishing 1988
 The Israeli Commando Assault on Green Island by Doron Geller
 Ian Black and Benny Morris - Israel's Secret Wars: A History of Israel's Intelligence Services.
 Samuel M. Katz - The Night Raiders: Israel's Naval Commandos at War.

Islands of Egypt
Islands of the Red Sea
Artificial islands of Africa